Tom Erik Oxholm (born 22 February 1959) is a former speed skater from Norway. He had his best period in the early 1980s.

At the 1980 Winter Olympics in Lake Placid, Oxholm won two bronze medals – on the 5,000 m and the 10,000 m. In addition, he finished third at both the European Allround Championships and the World Allround Championships that same year.

Oxholm was Norwegian Allround Champion in 1980 and 1986. He skated a few seasons for Oslo Skøiteklubb but otherwise represented Idrettsforeningen Fram in Larvik. After his active career, he enjoyed successes as a coach for Ådne Søndrål and Roger Strøm.

Medals 
An overview of medals won by Oxholm at important championships he participated in, listing the years in which he won each:

Personal records 
To put these personal records in perspective, the WR column lists the official world records on the dates that Oxholm skated his personal records.

Oxholm has an Adelskalender score of 164.031 points.

External links 
 
 Tom Erik Oxholm at Skateresults.com
 Personal records from Jakub Majerski's Speedskating Database
 Evert Stenlund's Adelskalender pages

1959 births
Living people
Norwegian male speed skaters
Olympic speed skaters of Norway
Olympic bronze medalists for Norway
Speed skaters at the 1980 Winter Olympics
Olympic medalists in speed skating
Medalists at the 1980 Winter Olympics
People from Larvik
World Allround Speed Skating Championships medalists
Sportspeople from Vestfold og Telemark